The 2013 Macau Grand Prix (formally the 60th Star River-Windsor Arch Macau Grand Prix) was a motor race for Formula Three cars that was held on the streets of Macau on 17 November 2013. Unlike other races, such as the Masters of Formula 3, the 2013 Macau Grand Prix was not a part of any Formula Three championship, but was open to entries from all Formula Three championships. The race itself was made up of two races: a ten-lap qualifying race that decided the starting grid for the fifteen-lap main race. The 2013 race was the 60th running of the Macau Grand Prix and the 31st for Formula Three cars.

The Grand Prix was won by Theodore Racing by Prema driver Alex Lynn from pole position, having won the event's Qualification Race the previous afternoon. Lynn led every lap of the main race to take victory and became the seventh driver to win the race for Theodore Racing. Second place went to the race's defending champion António Félix da Costa, competing for Carlin, while the podium was completed by Fortec Motorsport driver Pipo Derani.

Entry list and background
The Macau Grand Prix is a Formula Three race considered to be a stepping stone to higher motor racing categories such as Formula One and has been termed the territory's most prestigious international sporting event. The 2013 Macau Grand Prix was the 60th running of the event and the 31st time the race was held to Formula Three regulations. It took place on the  22-turn Guia Circuit on 17 November 2013 with three preceding days of practice and qualifying.

In order to compete in Macau, drivers had to compete in a Fédération Internationale de l'Automobile (FIA)-regulated championship meeting during the calendar year, in either the FIA Formula Three European Championship or one of the domestic championships, with the highest-ranked drivers in those series given priority in receiving an invitation to the meeting. Within the 28-car grid of the event, three of the four major Formula Three series were represented by their respective champion, Raffaele Marciello, the FIA Formula Three European champion, was joined in Macau by British champion Jordan King and Japanese series winner Yuichi Nakayama. German Formula Three title victor Marvin Kirchhöfer did not enter the event and so the highest-placed German series participant at Macau was fifth-placed John Bryant-Meisner. Dennis van de Laar was confirmed as a late replacement for European Formula Three driver Mitchell Gilbert at Mücke Motorsport who could not raise the necessary capital to compete in Macau due to poor results. Ed Jones and Nelson Mason, both European F3 Open Championship winners, replaced Félix Serrallés and Sandro Zeller; Serralés was replaced after his run of poor results in the European Championship.

Seven drivers who mainly competed in other series outside of Formula Three in 2013 became eligible for the Macau race: GP3 Series title contender Daniil Kvyat could not attend as he was at the  testing for Toro Rosso and António Félix da Costa, the defending winner of the event, replaced him. Eurocup Formula Renault 2.0 race winner Esteban Ocon and GP3 Series victor Carlos Sainz Jr. were announced among the lineup of drivers – Ocon to wait until his main series campaign had concluded before sealing his eligibility; Félix da Costa, Ocon and Sainz sealed their eligibility by competing in the MotorSport Vision Formula Three Cup, a second-tier Formula Three series in the United Kingdom, in its season-ending round at Snetterton. Three-time 2013 GP2 Series race winner Stefano Coletti and Kevin Korjus of the GP3 Series raced in the season-closing European Formula Three round at the Hockenheimring to prepare for Macau. The two other drivers who qualified for Macau were Formula Renault 3.5 Series racer Jazeman Jaafar who won two races at the Brands Hatch round of the British championship and Super GT competitor Yuhi Sekiguchi whose entry to the Masters of Formula 3 race allowed for his participation.

In April, the FIA single-seater commission president Gerhard Berger hinted to the press that the race would not have vehicles running with the more powerful 2013-specification engines from the All-Japan Formula Three championship due to a lack of car space and reliability concerns. The FIA World Motor Sport Council confirmed at a meeting at Goodwood House on 28 June that all engines installed in the cars had to be of 2012-specification. After the deaths of touring car driver Phillip Yau and motorcycle rider Luís Carreira in support races for the 2012 event, organisers installed crash protection fences for safety reasons.

Practice and qualifying
There were two 45-minute practice sessions preceding the Sunday race: one on Thursday morning and one on Friday morning. Alex Lynn set the fastest time for Theodore Racing by Prema in the opening practice session—held in variable weather conditions—with a lap of 2 minutes, 14.495 seconds, 0.061 seconds faster than any one else. His closest challenger was Félix da Costa in second in front of third-placed Coletti and Mücke Motorsport's Felix Rosenqvist in fourth position. Alexander Sims, Jaafar, Tom Blomqvist, Marciello, Lucas Auer and Korjus rounded out the session's top ten drivers. Sainz was the first driver to go off the slippery track and ricocheted off the Fisherman's Corner barrier with his car's rear. His teammate King understeered into the same barrier 11 minutes later, while Rosenqvist ran wide on dirty tyres at Lisboa turn and crashed at San Francisco Bend. Three other drivers—Sekiguchi, Lucas Wolf and Sun Zheng—failed to record a lap time by encountering incidents during the session.

Qualifying was divided into two sessions; the first was held on Thursday afternoon and ran for 40 minutes with the second held on Friday afternoon and lasted 30 minutes. The fastest time set by each driver from either session counted towards their final starting position for the qualification race. The first qualifying session had Rosenqvist come out on top with a late lap of 2 minutes, 12.751 seconds. He achieved this despite not slipstreaming any other car and recovered the lost time through the final sections of the track. Rosenqvist was 0.111 seconds faster than Félix da Costa with Sims a further three-tenths of a second slower in third. Harry Tincknell was fourth with Pipo Derani following in fifth having led the session in its opening minutes. Sainz ended up sixth in front of Coletti and Marciello. Korjus and Jaafar—who was forced to abort his fastest time because of red flags—rounded out the top ten. Auer was the fastest driver not to reach the top ten although he was fourth early on before other drivers improved on their best efforts. Following him were Blomqvist, King, Giovnazzi, Sekiguchi, William Buller, Nakayama, Ocon, Katsumasa Chiyo, Nicholas Latifi, Bryant-Meisner, Mason, Jones, Van de Laar, Sean Gelael, Lynn and Sun completing the order. Wolf sat out qualifying because of the damage sustained to his car in the first practice session. Lynn crashed his car at Fisherman's Bend in the first minutes which was temporarily halted to enable marshals to move his car into a safe location. The session ended early with a minute and 37 seconds remaining when Nakayama broke his suspension in an impact with a wall at Solitude Esses corner. Nakayama was unhurt.

In the second 45-minute practice session, Jaafar was quickest multiple times during the session until Korjus set a lap time of 2 minutes, 13.870 seconds which made him the fastest driver and ultimately held it to the conclusion of practice. Blomqvist was 0.063 seconds slower in second place. Carlin teammates Jaafar and Tincknell were third and fourth respectively. Lynn recovered from the first qualifying session to go fifth. Two more Carlin drivers: Sainz and Félix da Costa placed sixth and seventh. Sims, Buller and King occupied eighth to tenth places. Five drivers damaged their cars during the session: King made light contact with the barrier at Police Bend but rejoined after a replacement front wing was installed on his car. Auer struck a wall at the same turn with the left-hand side of the car and the session was stopped. Coletti's impact was harder and his car was extricated by a crane. Marciello did not continue after going deep at the Melco hairpin as he felt unsafe reversing. Chiyo's left-front corner was loosened from contact with a barrier lining the track.

In the second qualifying session, it was red-flagged soon after it started: Chiyo crashed at San Francisco Bend but the stoppage was short-lived as course workers worked swiftly to get running back under way. Lynn bettered Rosenqvist's benchmark first qualifying lap and recorded the fastest time which was suppressed soon by Derani. A second stoppage occurred when Sun and Mason crashed at Moorish corner just as Blomqvist went quickest. No driver managed a timed lap as Giovinazzi crashed against a barrier at Paiol turn, causing a third red flag. When the session restarted, Rosenqvist took provisional pole before Marciello took it with a 2 minutes, 11.555 seconds lap. Rosenqvist slipstreamed other cars but was cautious in the final two turns as he was confident of pole position. Lynn was a tenth of a second adrift in third. Auer moved up from his provisional grid slot to start fourth; he stalled in the pit lane.at the third restart. Félix da Costa dropped to fifth as Blomqvist improved to sixth. His teammate Derani took seventh. The top ten was completed by Carlin runners with Jaafar leading Tincknell and King. Behind them the rest of the field lined up as Sims, Buller, Korjus, Sainz, Ocon, Latifi, Coletti, Sekiguchi, Wolf, Giovinazzi, Nakayama, Van de Laar, Byrant-Meisner, Gelael, Mason, Jones, Chiyo and Sun. Jaafar, Nakayama and Jones each received penalties after second qualifying; Nakayama and Jones were demoted to the back of the grid for changing their engines while Jaafar dropped five places for a yellow flag infringement.

Qualifying classification

Notes:
 – Jazeman Jaafar was demoted five places because of a yellow flag infringement.
 – Yuichi Nakayama and Ed Jones started at the back of the field because of engine changes.

Qualifying race
The qualifying race to set the grid order for the main race started on 16 November at 14:00 Macau Standard Time (UTC+08:00). On the grid, pole sitter Marciello was slow off the line and fell to fifth. Rosenqvist made a fast getaway to take the lead only for Lynn to slipstream up behind him and claim it on the outside of Mandarin Oriental Bend. In turn, Rosenqvist then slipstreamed onto the back of Lynn heading towards Lisboa corner and reclaimed first position as Lynn was forced to run deep and go wide, narrowly avoiding a collision with a barrier. Further down the field a safety car caused by a startline crash neutralised competitive racing. Blomqvist stalled and his rear was impacted by the slow-starting Tincknell, littering debris across the track. Van de Laar's race ended prematurely as he stalled on the grid. All cars were instructed to drive through the pit lane since marshals were needed to remove the two stricken cars from the circuit. The  event restarted at the conclusion of lap three with Rosenqvist defending first place from Lynn after losing traction in his tyres from driving behind the safety car.

Lynn steered to the outside of Rosenqvist into Lisboa corner and turned in to take the lead. Félix da Costa overtook Auer for third up to Mandarin Oriental Bend, and Auer lost a further place to Marciello at Lisboa turn. Auer then crashed heavily against the barrier at San Francisco Bend while defending from Derani, ending his race early. Soon after Jones hit a bump going off the racing line at Fisherman's Bend and made contact with the wall. Yellow flags were shown in the area but were withdrawn after he was removed from the circuit. Up front Lynn continued to lead Rosenqvist while Félix da Costa was being hounded by Marciello for third. Meanwhile, King battled Sims for fifth with Coletti, Buller and Ocon in close formation in a duel over sixth. Mason was imposed a drive-through penalty after his team started his engine while stationary in the fast lane of the pit lane. Sims got ahead of King for fifth and began closing up to Derani. Buller overtook Coletti while Sainz passed Korjus for 11th. Marciello moved in front of Félix da Costa heading towards Lisboa corner on the fifth lap for third. Marciello set what was at that point a new fastest lap of the race as he drew closer to Rosenqvist. Ocon could not resist Sainz's challenge for tenth while the struggling Jaafar was overtaken by Korjus on the next lap.

Mason was black-flagged as he opted to continue racing and not take his drive-through penalty. Rosenqvist concentrated on not allowing Marciello get close to him while Félix da Costa and Derani waited to capitalise on any mistakes. Sainz overtook Coletti for ninth as Giovinazzi won a battle against Gelael for 17th. Giovinazzi then gained a further place with a pass on Wolf for 16th. Coletti lost ninth to Ocon in the closing stages while Korjus pulled to the side of the track at Fisherman's Bend with smoke billowing from his engine. Lynn opened up a two-second lead over the rest of the field to win the qualification race and pole position for the Grand Prix itself. He was joined on the front row of the grid by Rosenqvist while Marciello completed the podium despite gaining on Rosenqvist who felt a loss in tyre grip. Behind the two, Félix da Costa followed with Derani fifth. Sims, King and Buller were in close formation for positions six to eight. Sainz and Ocon completed the top ten. Coletti, Jaafar, Latifil, Sekiguchi, Giovnazzi, Wolf, Gelael, Nakayama, Chiyo, Bryant-Meisner, Sun, Mason and Korjus rounded out the 23 classified finishers.

Qualifying race classification

Main race

The race began at 15:30 local time on 17 November. Three drivers took penalties: Korjus was demoted places because of an engine change. Tincknell was required to start from 27th as he was adjudged to have caused the collision between himself and Blomqvist. Mason joined Tincknell because he ignored his drive-through penalty due to a malfunctioning radio. Lynn maintained the lead into the first corner while Derani made a brisk start to move into second. Ocon stalled on the grid but later got moving. As the field drove down towards the fast Mandarin Oriental Bend some bumping occurred. This caused Rosenqvist to hit the barrier and broke his suspension after battling with Marciello for the ideal line. Marciello's car sustained damage but continued with an oversteer. Soon after, Auer pushed Bryant-Meisner off the racing line, causing the latter to crash into the wall. Gelael spun trying to avoid hitting Bryant-Meisner, causing Auer to plough into him. The events meant Bryant-Meisner, Gelael and Auer retired from the race.

Giovnazzi spun at the Melco hairpin but recovered. The safety car's deployment was necessitated to allow for a track clearing. At the end of the first lap, Lynn led from Derani, Félix da Costa, Marciello, Sims, Coletti, Buller, King, Sainz and Latifi. At the restart, Lynn held the lead and Derani was passed by Félix da Costa on the outside at Lisboa corner. Sims lined up an pass on Marciello but realised it could not be completed and eased off. King fell to ninth when Sainz overtook him. Lynn increased his lead to two seconds in the following laps. Marciello attempted to force his way through Derani but the latter resisted his overtaking attempts. Sainz moved in front of both Coletti and Buller but the two drivers retook their lost positions. Marciello passed Derani at Lisboa corner for third place. On lap seven, Coletti and Buller collided, causing the latter's retirement but the former restarted racing after loing positions by spinning onto the escape road. The main beneficiary of the crash was King who moved to seventh. Both King and his Carlin teammate Jaafar passed Sainz after a battle for sixth. Sun spun off at Fisherman's Bend, prompting the brief waving of localised yellow flags.

Maricello pushed but lost control of his car at the R Bend and collided against a barrier. His retirement relieved pressure off Félix da Costa who used the situation to close up to Lynn. Sims slowed at about lap ten due to an engine temperature sensor problem which he corrected by short shifting and pulling out of Derani's slipstream. Félix da Costa gained on Lynn to be just over a second behind with four laps to go. He reduced the gap to 1.3 seconds under yellow flag conditions for Wolf's stranded car at Lisboa corner, but could not get close to affect an pass on Lynn who maintained the lead for the rest of the race to become the seventh Macau Grand Prix winner for Theodore Racing. The 2012 winner Félix da Costa finished second, 1.173 seconds in arrears, while Derani completed the podium in third. Off the podium, Sims finished fourth. The highest-placed rookie King led Carlin teammates Jaafar and Sainz in the next three places. Blomqvist came from the back of the field to finish eighth with Latifi ninth. Ocon recovered from his stall to place tenth. Outside the top ten, Sekiguchi was 11th and led fellow countryman Nakayama in 12th. The British pair of Buller and Tincknell followed in 13th and 14th with Chiyo, Giovinazzi, Mason, Van der Laar, Jones, Wolf and Korjus the final classified finishers.

Main race classification

Notes:
 – Harry Tincknell was mandated to start on the fourteenth row of the grid for causing an avoidable collision.
 – Nelson Mason was required to begin at the back of field after ignoring a penalty notice during the qualification race.
 – Kevin Korjus was demoted places for changing his engine after the qualification race.

See also
 2013 Guia Race of Macau

References

External links
 

Macau Grand Prix Formula Three
Macau Grand Prix
Macau Grand Prix
Macau Grand Prix Formula Three